Michael Kokocinski (born 7 February 1985) is a German retired footballer.

Career 
He has previously played for both 1860 Munich II, Bayern Munich II as well as Wacker Burghausen, Kickers Offenbach and 1860 Rosenheim.

References

External links

1985 births
Living people
German footballers
Germany youth international footballers
TSV 1860 Munich II players
FC Bayern Munich II players
Kickers Offenbach players
SV Wacker Burghausen players
German people of Polish descent
3. Liga players
Regionalliga players
Association football defenders
Association football midfielders
TSV 1860 Rosenheim players
Türkgücü München players